Ebert Willian Amâncio or simply Betão (born 11 November 1983 in São Paulo), is a Brazilian professional footballer who plays for and captains Avaí.

He plays as a central defender and can also play on the right side of the back four. Betão is known for his positioning, aerial ability, strength and coverage of the opposing players.

Career
Amâncio began his career in Corinthians before signing a four-year contract with Sochaux for €1 million on 6 August 2007.

On 14 August 2007, Sochaux decided to sell him, which led to Betão returning to Corinthians.

Betão's contract with Corinthians expired on 31 December 2007 and was offered a three-year renewal but declined. After 14 years playing for Corinthians and wearing the captain's armband during the 2007 season, Betão was released from Corinthians after being made the scapegoat of the team's relegation by the chairman at the time. On 8 January 2008, Betão trained with Santos and the following day, signed a three-year contract with the team.

Betão made his debut for Santos on 16 January 2008 in the Campeonato Paulista, where they lost 0–2 against Portuguesa. He scored his first goal on 24 February 2008 in the 4–1 victory over Ituano for the Campeonato Paulista 2008.

On 14 January 2015, Betão announced his return to Dynamo Kyiv signing a contract until the end of the season. After only making appearances in the Ukrainian Super Cup, he ended up winning the cup and the Ukrainian Premier League that season. In June 2015, the president of Dynamo Ihor Surkis has confirmed that the club has not renewed Betao's contract and have ended their cooperation with him. On 3 July 2015, he signed a three-year contract with Evian.

On 15 August 2016, Betão returned to Brazil and joined second tier club Avaí. Following the side's promotion to Série A, his contract was extended for a year on 7 December 2018.

Career statistics

Honours

Corithians
Torneio Rio – São Paulo: 2002
Copa do Brasil: 2002
Campeonato Paulista: 2003
Campeonato Brasileiro Série A: 2005

Dynamo Kyiv
Ukrainian Premier League: 2008–09, 2014-15
Ukrainian Cup: 2014–15
Ukrainian Super Cup: 2009–10

Avaí
Campeonato Catarinense: 2019, 2021

References

External links
 

1983 births
Living people
Association football central defenders
Brazilian footballers
Brazilian expatriate footballers
Expatriate footballers in Ukraine
Expatriate footballers in France
Sport Club Corinthians Paulista players
Santos FC players
FC Dynamo Kyiv players
Thonon Evian Grand Genève F.C. players
Avaí FC players
Associação Atlética Ponte Preta players
Campeonato Brasileiro Série A players
Campeonato Brasileiro Série B players
Ukrainian Premier League players
Ligue 1 players
Brazilian expatriate sportspeople in Ukraine
Footballers from São Paulo